The post-Angkor period of Cambodia, also called the Middle Period, refers to the historical era from the early 15th century to 1863, the beginning of the French protectorate of Cambodia. As reliable sources (for the 15th and 16th centuries, in particular) are very rare, a defensible and conclusive explanation that relates to concrete events that manifest the decline of the Khmer Empire, recognised unanimously by the scientific community, has so far not been produced. However, most modern historians have approached a consensus in which several distinct and gradual changes of religious, dynastic, administrative and military nature, environmental problems and ecological imbalance coincided with shifts of power in Indochina and must all be taken into account to make an interpretation. In recent years scholars' focus has shifted increasingly towards human–environment interactions and the ecological consequences, including natural disasters, such as flooding and droughts.

Stone epigraphy in temples, which had been the primary source for Khmer history, is already a rarity throughout the 13th century, ends in the third decade of the fourteenth, and does not resume until the mid-16th century. Recording of the Royal Chronology discontinues with King Jayavarman IX Parameshwara (or Jayavarma-Paramesvara), who reigned from 1327 to 1336. There exists not a single contemporary record of even a king’s name for over 200 years. Construction and maintenance of monumental temple architecture had come to a standstill after Jayavarman VII's reign. According to author Michael Vickery there only exist external sources for Cambodia’s 15th century, the Chinese Ming Shilu (engl. veritable records) annals and the earliest Royal Chronicle of Ayutthaya, which must be interpreted with greatest caution. 

The single incident which undoubtedly reflects reality, the central reference point for the entire 15th century, is a Siamese intervention of some undisclosed nature at the capital Yasodharapura (Angkor Thom) around the year 1431. Historians relate the event to the shift of Cambodia's political centre southward to the river port region of Phnom Penh and later Longvek.

Sources for the 16th century are more numerous, although still coming from outside of Cambodia. The kingdom is centred at the Mekong, prospering as an integral part of the Asian maritime trade network, via which the first contact with European explorers and adventurers does occur. Wars with the Siamese resulted in loss of territory in the West and eventually the conquest of the capital Longvek in 1594. The Vietnamese on their "Southward March" reached Prei Nokor/Saigon at the Mekong Delta in the 17th century. This event initiates the slow process of Cambodia losing access to the seas and independent marine trade.

Siamese and Vietnamese dominance intensified during the 17th and 18th century, provoking frequent displacements of the seat of power as the Khmer monarch's authority decreased to the state of a vassal. Both powers alternately demanded subservience and tribute from the Cambodian court. In the early 19th century with dynasties in Vietnam and Siam firmly established, Cambodia was placed under joint suzerainty, having lost its national sovereignty. British agent John Crawfurd states: "...the King of that ancient Kingdom is ready to throw himself under the protection of any European nation..." To save Cambodia from being incorporated into Vietnam and Siam, King Ang Duong agreed to colonial France's offers of protection, which took effect with King Norodom Prohmbarirak signing and officially recognising the French protectorate on 11 August 1863.

Historical background and causes
The Khmer Empire had steadily gained hegemonic power over most of mainland Southeast Asia since its early days in the 8th and 9th centuries. Rivalries and wars with its western neighbour, the Pagan Kingdom of the Mon people of modern-day Burma were less numerous and decisive than those with Champa to the east. The Khmer and Cham Hindu kingdoms remained for centuries preoccupied with each other's containment and it has been argued that one of the Khmer's military objectives was "...in the reigns of the Angkor kings Suryavarman II and Jayavarman VII." the conquest of the Cham ports, "...important in the international trade of the time". Even though the Khmer suffered a number of serious defeats, such as the Cham invasion of Angkor in 1177, the empire quickly recovered, capable to strike back, as it was the case in 1181 with the invasion of the Cham city-state of Vijaya.

Mongol incursions into southern China and political and cultural pressure caused the southward migration of the Tai people and Thai people and their settling on the upper Chao Phraya River in the 12th century. The Sukhothai Kingdom and later the Ayutthaya kingdom were established and "...conquered the Khmers of the upper and central Menam valley and greatly extended their territory..."

Military setbacks
Although a number of sources, such as the Cambodian Royal Chronicles and the Royal chronicles of Ayutthaya contain recordings of military expeditions and raids with associated dates and the names of sovereigns and warlords, several influential scholars, such as David Chandler and Michael Vickery doubt the accuracy and reliability of these texts. Other authors criticise this rigid "overall assessment", though.

David Chandler states in A Global Encyclopedia of Historical Writing, Volume 2: "Michael Vickery has argued that Cambodian chronicles, including this one, that treat events earlier than 1550 cannot be verified, and were often copied from Thai chronicles about Thailand..."
Linguist Jean-Michel Filippi concludes: "The chronology of Cambodian history itself is more a chrono-ideology with a pivotal role offered to Angkor." Similarities apply to Thai chronological records, with the notable example of the Ramkhamhaeng controversy.

According to the Siamese Royal chronicles of Paramanuchitchinorot, clashes occurred in 1350, around 1380, 1418 and 1431.

Land or People?
Siamese sources record the habit of capturing sizeable numbers of inhabitants from the capital cities and centres of civilisation of the defeated parties in Chiang Mai and Angkor which can be assumed to have accelerated the cultural decline.

Author Michael Vickery debates the degree of importance of this subject in his publication "Two Historical Records of the Kingdom of Vientiane - Land or People?": "It is not at all certain that Angkor desired manpower in central Thailand, rather than simply control over the rich agricultural resources." and "...whether the political economy of early Southeast Asia resulted in rulers being more concerned with control of land or control of people..." and "...both sides of this discussion have offered ad hoc, case-by-case pronunciamentos, which are then repeated like mantra... Critical discussion of the question is long overdue..."

Contrary views

Author Akin Rabibhadana, who quotes Ram Khamhaeng: "One particular characteristic of the historical Southeast Asian mainland states was the lack of manpower. The need for manpower is well illustrated by events following each war between Thailand and her neighbours. The victorious side always carried off a large number of people from the conquered territory. Whole villages were often moved into the territory of the conqueror, where they were assimilated and became the population of the conqueror."

David K. Wyatt: "As much as anything else, the Tai müang was an instrument for the efficient use of manpower in a region where land was plentiful in relation to labor and agricultural technology."

And Aung-Thwin wrote: "Much of the warfare of early Southeast Asia witnessed the victor carrying off half the population of the vanquished foe and later resettling them on his own soil. Pagan was located in the dry belt of Burma, and depended mainly upon irrigated agriculture for its economic base. Land was plentiful but labor was extremely difficult to obtain."

Dynastic and religious factors

The complete transition from the early Khmer kingdom to the firm establishment of the Mahidharapura dynasty (first king Jayavarman VI, 1080 to 1107), which originated west of the Dângrêk Mountains at Phimai in the Mun river valley lasted several decades. Some historians argue, that these kings failed to acquire absolute central administrative control and had limited access to local resources. The dynasty discontinued "ritual policy" and genealogical traditions. Further momentum ensued as Mahayana Buddhism was eventually tolerated and several Buddhist kings emerged, including Suryavarman I, Rajendravarman II and Jayavarman VII. 

These rulers were not considered, and did not consider themselves, as divine, which lead to a shift in perception of royal authority, central power and a loss of dynastic prestige with respect to foreign rulers. Effectively the royal subjects were given permission to re-direct attention and support from the Hindu state of military dominance with its consecrated leader, the "Varman"—protector king, towards the inner-worldly alternative with the contradictory teachings of the Buddhist temple. Indravarman III (c. 1295-1308) adopted Theravada Buddhism as the state religion, which implied an even more passive, introverted focus towards individual and personal responsibility to accumulate merit to achieve nirvana.

Miriam T. Stark argues that competition and rivalries in royal succession, usurpers and "second grade" rulers characterised the kingdom since the 9th century. Periods of "...consolidation alternated with political fragmentation [as] only few rulers were able to wrest control from the provincial level".

Debate remains on the progress of the imperial society as the kingdom grew and occupied foreign lands. Authors present numerous theories about the relationship between Southeast Asian kings and the populace's loyalties, nature and degree of identity, the Mandala concept and the effects of changing state-religion. Scholar Ben Kiernan highlights a tendency to identify with a universal religion rather than to adhere to the concept of a people or nation, as he refers to author Victor Lieberman in: Blood and Soil: Modern Genocide 1500-2000 "[local courts make]...no formal demand, that rulers be of the same ethnicity as their subjects"

Environmental problems and infrastructural breakdown
Historians increasingly maintain the idea that decline was caused by progressing ecological imbalance of the delicate irrigation network and canal system of "...a profoundly ritualized, elaborate system of hydraulic engineering..." at Angkor's Yasodharapura. Recent studies indicate that the irrigation system was overworked and gradually started to silt up, amplified by large scale deforestation. Permanent monument construction projects and maintenance of temples instead of canals and dykes put an enormous strain on the royal resources and drained thousands of slaves and common people from the public workforce and caused tax deficits. 

Author Heng L. Thung addressed common sense in "Geohydrology and the decline of Angkor" as he sums things up: "...the preoccupation of the Khmers with the need to store water for the long dry season. Each household needed a pond to provide drinking and household water for both man and beast. The barays [reservoirs] of Angkor were simply the manifestation of the need of an urban population. Water was the fountain of life for Angkor; a disruption in its supply would be fatal."

Recent Lidar (Light detection and ranging) Geo-Scans of Angkor have produced new data, that have caused several "Eureka moments" and "have profoundly transformed our understanding of urbanism in the region of Angkor". Results of dendrochronological studies imply prolonged periods of drought between the 14th and 15th centuries. As a result, recent re-interpretations of the epoch put greater emphasis on human–environment interactions and the ecological consequences.

Chaktomuk era
Following the abandonment of the capital Yasodharapura and the Angkorian sites, the few remaining Khmer survivors, with Siamese help, established a new capital around two-hundred kilometres to the south-east on the site which is modern day Phnom Penh, at the confluence of the Mekong and the Tonle Sap river. Thus, it controlled the river commerce of the Khmer heartland, upper Siam and the Laotian kingdoms with access, by way of the Mekong Delta, to the international trade routes that linked the Chinese coast, the South China Sea, and the Indian Ocean. Unlike its inland predecessor, this society was more open to the outside world and relied mainly on commerce as the source of wealth. The adoption of maritime trade with China during the Ming dynasty (1368–1644) provided lucrative opportunities for members of the Cambodian elite who controlled royal trading monopolies.

Historians consent that as the capital ceased to exist, the temples at Angkor remained as central for the nation as they always had been. 
David P. Chandler: "The 1747 inscription is the last extensive one at Angkor Wat and reveals the importance of the temple in Cambodian religious life barely a century before it was "discovered" by the French."

Longvek era
King Ang Chan I (1516–1566) moved the capital from Phnom Penh north to Longvek at the banks of the Tonle Sap river. Trade was an essential feature and "...even though they appeared to have a secondary role in the Asian commercial sphere in the 16th century, the Cambodian ports did indeed thrive." Products traded there included precious stones, metals, silk, cotton, incense, ivory, lacquer, livestock (including elephants), and rhinoceros horn.

First Contact with the West
Messengers of Portuguese admiral Alfonso de Albuquerque, conqueror of Malacca arrived in Indochina in 1511, the earliest documented official contact with European sailors. By the late sixteenth and early seventeenth centuries, Longvek maintained flourishing communities of Chinese, Indonesians, Malays, Japanese, Arabs, Spaniards, English, Dutch and Portuguese traders.

Christian missionary activities began in 1555 with Portuguese clergyman friar Gaspar da Cruz, the first to set foot in the Kingdom of Cambodia, who "...wasn’t able to spread the word of God and he was seriously ill[sic]." Subsequent attempts did not yield any results that could substantiate a congregation.

Siamese encroachment

Cambodia was attacked by Thai prince and warlord Naresuan in 1583. and Longvek was captured in 1594 which marked the beginning of the establishment of a Siamese military governor in the city. For the first time a degree of foreign political control was established over the kingdom as the seat of the sovereign was demoted to that of a vassal. Following the Siam capture of the capital at Longvek, Cambodian royals were taken hostage and relocated at the court of Ayutthaya, kept under permanent Thai influence and left to compromise and out-compete each other under the overlord's scrutiny.

The initially lucky circumstance of some royal family members, managing to seek refuge at the Lao court of Vientiane, ended as one of many sinister chapters for the health and integrity of Khmer royalty. The refugees never returned to demand their claims. Their sons, born and raised in Lao, were alienated, as can be expected, and while "moderately" manipulated, engaged in rivalries with their relatives in Siam, and had the ruling king Ram I., who was of lower birth, killed with the help of Spanish and Portuguese sailors.

Shortly after they were killed and defeated in the Cambodian–Spanish War, with foreign hands—Malays and Chams—involved. This pattern of royal indignity is noticeable in its continuity during the 17th, 18th and 19th centuries, the Vietnamese court in Hue joining in as yet another stage of royal drama. Promoted and orchestrated by their protectors, who successfully interfered in marriage policies, royal contender's quarrels often prevented any chance of restoring an effective King of competitive authority for decades.

Srey Santhor era
Kings Preah Ram I and Preah Ram II moved the capital several times and established their royal capitals at Tuol Basan (Srey Santhor) around 40 kilometres north-east of Phnom Penh, later Pursat, Lavear Em and finally Oudong. In 1596 Spanish and Portuguese conquistadores from Manila raided and razed Srei Santhor.

In 1597 Malay Muslim merchants massacred the Spanish conquistadors who attempted to conquer Cambodia.

Oudong Era

By the 17th century Siam and Vietnam increasingly fought over control of the fertile Mekong basin, enhancing pressure on weakened Cambodia. The 17th century was also the beginning of direct relations between post-Angkor Cambodia and Vietnam, that is the war between Nguyễn lords who ruled central and southern Vietnam and Trịnh lords in the north.

Henri Mouhot: "Travels in the Central Parts of Indo-China" 1864

Loss of the Mekong Delta

By the late 15th century, the Vietnamese—descendants of the Sinic civilisation sphere—had conquered some of the territories of the principalities of Champa. Some of the surviving Chams began their diaspora in 1471, many re-settling in Khmer territory. However, the Cambodian Chronicle does not mention the Cham arrival in Cambodia until the 17th century. The last remaining principality of Champa, Panduranga, survived until 1832.

Traditional course

In 1620 the Vietnamese on their southwards expansion (Nam tiến) had reached the Mekong Delta, a hitherto Khmer domain. Also in 1620 the Khmer king Chey Chettha II (1618–28) married a daughter of lord Nguyễn Phúc Nguyên, one of the Nguyễn lords, who held sway over southern Vietnam for most of the Lê dynasty era from 1428 to 1788. Three years later, king Chey Chettha allowed Vietnam to establish a custom-post at Prey Nokor, modern day Ho Chi Minh City. Vietnam after gaining independence from the Chinese now instituted its own version of the frontier policies of the Chinese empire and by the end of the 17th century, the region was under full Vietnamese administrative control. Cambodia's access to international sea trade was now hampered by Vietnamese taxes and permissions.

Contrary views

The story of a Cambodian king falling in love with a Vietnamese princess, who requested and obtained Kampuchea Krom, the Mekong Delta for Vietnam is folklore, dismissed by scholars and not even mentioned in the Royal Chronicles.

In the process of re-interpretation of the royal records and their rather doubtful contents, Michael Vickery again postulates that future publications take these contradicting facts into account: "First, the very concept of a steady Vietnamese "Push to the South" (nam tiến) requires rethinking. It was not steady, and its stages show that there was no continuing policy of southward expansion. Each move was ad hoc, in response to particular challenges..."

In 1642 Cambodian prince Ponhea Chan became king after overthrowing and assassinating king Outey. Malay Muslim merchants in Cambodia helped him in his takeover, and he subsequently converted to Islam from Buddhism, changed his name to Ibrahim, married a Malay woman and reigned as Ramathipadi I. His reign marked the historical apogee of Muslim rule in mainland Southeast Asia.

Ramathipadi defeated the Dutch East India Company in naval engagements of the Cambodian–Dutch War during 1643 and 1644. Pierre de Rogemortes, the ambassador of the Company was killed alongside a third of his 432 men and it was not until two centuries later that Europeans played any important and influential role in Cambodian affairs. In the 1670s the Dutch left all the trading posts they had maintained in Cambodia after the massacre in 1643. The first Vietnamese military intervention took place in 1658-59, in which rebel Cambodian princes, Ibrahim Ramathipadi's own brothers, had requested military support to depose the Muslim ruler and restore Buddhism.

Siam, which might otherwise have been courted as an ally against Vietnamese incursions in the 18th century, was itself involved in prolonged conflicts with Burma and in 1767 the Siamese capital of Ayutthaya was completely destroyed. However, Siam recovered and soon reasserted its dominion over Cambodia. The youthful Khmer king Ang Eng (1779–96) was installed as monarch at Oudong while Siam annexed Cambodia's Battambang and Siem Reap provinces. The local rulers became vassals under direct Siamese rule.

A renewed struggle between Siam and Vietnam for control of Cambodia and the Mekong basin in the early 19th century resulted in Vietnamese dominance over a Cambodian vassal king. Justin Corfield writes in "French Indochina": "[1807] the Vietnamese expanded their lands by establishing a protectorate over Cambodia. However king […] Ang Duong was keen on Cambodia becoming independent of [...] Thailand [...] and Vietnam [...] and sought help from the British in Singapore. When that failed, he enlisted the help of the French."

Attempts to force Cambodians to adopt Vietnamese customs caused several rebellions against Vietnamese rule. The most notable took place from 1840 to 1841, spreading through much of the country.

Siam and Vietnam had fundamentally different attitudes concerning their relationship with Cambodia. The Siamese shared a common religion, mythology, literature, and culture with the Khmer, having adopted many religious and cultural practices. The Thai Chakri kings followed the Chakravatin system of an ideal universal ruler, ethically and benevolently ruling over all his subjects.
The Vietnamese enacted a civilising mission, as they viewed the Khmer people as culturally inferior and regarded the Khmer lands as legitimate site for colonisation by settlers from Vietnam.

The territory of the Mekong Delta became a territorial dispute between Cambodians and Vietnamese. Cambodia gradually lost control of the Mekong Delta. By the 1860s French colonist had taken over the Mekong Delta and establish the colony of French Cochinchina.

Vietnamese Invasions of Cambodia in Oudong Era

As the Vietnamese empire consolidated itself over the eastern mainland under Gia Long and Minh Mang, Cambodia fell to the Vietnamese invasion in 1811. The invasion was initially initiated by the ruling king, King Ang Chan II's (r. 1806–35) request to Gia Long to suppress his own brothers, Ang Snguon and Ang Em, who were in rebellion against him. The two brothers fled to Thailand, while Ang Chan became a Vietnamese vassal.

In 1820 Gia Long died and his fourth son Minh Mang inherited the throne. Both Minh Mang and his father were strong adherents of Confucianism, but Minh Mang was a sadistic isolationist and strong ruler. He removed the Viceroy of Cambodia and Saigon in 1832, triggered the pro-Catholic Lê Văn Khôi revolt against him in 1833. The Thai army, intended to support the rebellion, launched an offensive campaign against the Vietnamese on occupying Cambodia. This led Ang Chan to flee to Saigon, as Rama III promised to restore the Kingdom of Cambodia and punish the insolence of the Kingdom of Vietnam. In 1834, the rebellion in Southern Vietnam was suppressed, and Minh Mang ordered troops to launch the second invasion of Cambodia. This drove most of the Thai forces to the west and reinstalled Ang Chan as the puppet king in Phnom Penh, later succeeded by his daughter, Queen Ang Mey (r. 1835–41). Later that year, the Tây Thành Province was established, the Vietnamese occupied Cambodia result in direct Vietnamese control. For the next six years, the Vietnamese emperor had tried to force the Cambodians to adopt Vietnamese culture by cultural assimilation, a progress that historian David P. Chandler called The Vietnamization of Cambodia.

The death of Minh Mang in early 1841 halted the Vietnamization of Cambodia. With 35,000 Thai troops, they took advantage the of dire situation in Vietnam, rushed into the Tây Thành Province, and were able to fend off Vietnamese counteroffensives in late 1845. The new Vietnamese emperor, Thieu Tri, readied to make peace with Siam, and in June 1847 a peace treaty was signed. The Kingdom of Cambodia under Ang Duong regained its independence after 36 years of brutal Vietnamese occupations and Siamese interventions.

Consequences and conclusions

European colonialism and Anglo-French rivalries

Admiral Léonard Charner proclaimed the formal annexation of three provinces of Cochinchina into the French Empire on 31 July 1861, the beginning of the colonial era of France in South-East Asia. France's interference in Indochina was thus a fact and the colonial community pressing to establish a commercial network in the region based on the Mekong river, ideally linking up with the gigantic market of southern China. 

Dutch author H.Th. Bussemaker has argued that these French colonial undertakings and acquisitions in the region were mere reactions to or counter-measures against British geo-strategy and economic hegemony. "For the British, it was obvious that the French were trying to undercut British expansionism in India and China by interposing themselves in Indochina. The reason for this frantic expansionism was the hope that the Mekong river would prove to be navigable to the Chinese frontier, which then would open the immense Chinese market for French industrial goods." To save the kingdom's national identity and integrity, King Ang Duong initiated secret negotiations in a letter to Napoleon III seeking to obtain some agreement of protection with France.

In June 1884, the French governor of Cochinchina, Charles Thomson went to Phnom Penh, Norodom's capital, and demanded approval of a treaty with Paris that promised far-reaching changes such as the abolition of slavery, the institution of private land ownership, and the establishment of French résidents in provincial cities. The king reluctantly signed the agreement. The Philaster Treaty of 1874 confirmed French sovereignty over the whole of Cochin China and on 16 November 1887 the Indo-Chinese Union was established.

Outlook

Archaeology of Cambodia is considered to be still in its infancy. The introduction of new methods of geochronology such as LIDAR-Scanning and Luminescence dating has revealed new sets and kinds of data and studies on climate—and environmental imbalances have become more numerous in recent years. Reflection of results obviously requires time, as in an article of the US National Academy of Sciences of the year 2010, the author complains: "Historians and archaeologists have, with a few notable exceptions only rarely considered the role played by environment and climate in the history of Angkor".

Widely debated remain historiography, culturalism and other aspects of the historical sources as wide contradictions suggest. Probably the greatest challenge is to synchronise all research with the conclusions of the neighbouring countries. Delicate issues exist that are rooted in this historical period (border disputes, cultural heritage), which are politically relevant and far from solved. Definitive conclusions with all contributing factors in a reasonable context are clearly future events.

Miriam T. Stark in: "From Funan to Angkor Collapse and Regeneration in Ancient Cambodia"

See also

References

Bibliography

External links

 The Ram Khamhaeng Inscription - The fake that did not come true
 What the collapse of ancient capitals can teach us about the cities of today
 Center for Southeast Asian Studies Japan
 Center for Khmer Studies
 
 Strange Parallels - Southeast Asia in a Global Context by Victor Lieberman
 Maritime boundary delimitation in the gulf of Thailand - information on multiple unsolved regional border disputes,dating back to the dark ages

History of Cambodia by period
2nd millennium in Cambodia
19th century in Cambodia
18th century in Cambodia